To Be Number One is a 1991 Hong Kong gangster film directed by Poon Man-kit, and produced by Stephen Shiu. The film is based on the rise and fall of a real-life gangster Ng Sik-ho, who is portrayed in the film by Ray Lui. To Be Number One was a critical and box office success, grossing HK$38,703,363 at the Hong Kong box office and winning the Hong Kong Film Award for Best Film at the 11th Hong Kong Film Awards. In 2017, the film was remade as Chasing the Dragon.

Plot
The protagonist Ho begins the story as a poor Teochew refugee from Communist China, and leads his men to become pawns of the corrupt policeman Fat Kwan to control the drug trade. After Ho establishes himself, Fat Kwan turns against him, cripples him and kills many of his men, but Ho keeps rising and eliminates all his enemies. However Ho is blinded by his growing power, and his empire ends with the establishment of ICAC.

Cast and roles
 Ray Lui as Crippled Ho
 Lawrence Ng as Ming
 Waise Lee as Man
 Kent Cheng as Fat Kwan
 Cecilia Yip as Tse Yuen-yin
 Amy Yip as May
 Kenneth Tsang as Chief Inspector Tiger Lui
 Elvis Tsui as Dummy
 Tommy Wong as Loud Hung
 Dickens Chan as Big Sha
 Frankie Chan as Little Hak
 Lo Lieh as Boss Tin
 Ng Man-tat as Gold Teeth Ping
 Lau Shun as Boss Fung
 Lau Kong as Chief Inspector Lung
 Lily Ng as Man's wife	
 Elvina Kong as Lui's deranged mistress
 Chin Tsi-ang as Ming's mother
 Wong Chi-keung as Fat restaurant boss
 Koo Wai-jan as Restaurateur boss' wife
 Victor Hon as Boss Kwong
 Dion Lam as Tin's bodyguard
 Chung Fat as Fat
 Lui tat as Opium den worker
 Wai Ching as Lui's assistant
 Jameson Lam as Ping's gangster
 Lee Ying-kit
 
 Wong Kam-tong as Policeman interrogating Ho
 Mark Houghton as OSCG officer
 Tam Wai-man as Kwan's thug
 Leung Sam as Barber
 Fong Li as Chiang
 Wong Chung-kui as Kun
 Ng Kwok-fai as Unlucky gangster
 Ho Wing-cheung as Tin's bodyguard
 Chang Sing-kwong as Fat's thug
 Choi Hin-cheung
 Chan Hon-man

Awards and nominations

External links
 
 HK cinemagic entry

 

1991 films
1990s crime films
1990s biographical films
Hong Kong crime films
Hong Kong biographical films
Triad films
Best Film HKFA
Golden Harvest films
1990s Cantonese-language films
Films about the illegal drug trade
Films set in the 1960s
Hong Kong gangster films
Films set in the 1970s
Films set in Hong Kong
Films shot in Hong Kong
Films directed by Poon Man-kit
1990s Hong Kong films